BHF may refer to:
Bahrain Handball Federation
Bangladesh Handball Federation
Bolivian hemorrhagic fever
British Heart Foundation
BHF Bank
Buffered HF